Stănilești is a commune in Vaslui County, Western Moldavia, Romania. It is composed of seven villages: Bogdana-Voloseni, Budu Cantemir, Chersăcosu, Gura Văii, Pogănești, Săratu and Stănilești.

Stănilești was the site of the 1711 Battle of Stănilești between the Russo-Moldavian and the Ottoman armies.

References

Communes in Vaslui County
Localities in Western Moldavia
Populated places on the Prut